John Sharp (15 February 1878 – 28 January 1938) was an English sportsman who is most famous for his eleven-season playing career at Everton from 1899–1910. It saw him win two caps for his country, as well as being a cricketer for Lancashire County Cricket Club who played in three Test matches for the England cricket team in 1909.

Life
From 1899 to 1914 Sharp played cricket regularly for Lancashire and played in every match of 1904 when the Championship was won without a defeat. After World War I he played as an amateur and captained the Lancashire side from 1923 to 1925.

His position on the football pitch was right winger. After being signed from Aston Villa Sharp went on to be a Championship runner-up on three occasions with Everton, scored a goal in the club's 2–1 defeat to Sheffield Wednesday in the 1907 FA Cup Final and was an FA Cup winner one year previously against Newcastle United. His portrait appeared on 14 editions of cigarette packets, the mark of a popular sportsman at the time.

When his playing career ended, Sharp became a director of Everton, a position he held for many years. He started a sports shop in Whitechapel Liverpool, which existed until the 1980s before being taken over by JJB Sports and later closed. There was also a shop in Chester, within the Grosvenor Precinct. His shop was the official supplier of playing strips to both Everton and Liverpool for many years.

His brother, Bertram, was also a footballer with Aston Villa, Everton and Southampton who later became a director of Everton as well as a cricketer with Herefordshire County Cricket Club.

References

External links

See also
List of English cricket and football players

1878 births
1938 deaths
English cricketers
Lancashire cricket captains
England Test cricketers
Players cricketers
English footballers
Aston Villa F.C. players
Everton F.C. players
England international footballers
Everton F.C. directors and chairmen
English Football League players
English Football League representative players
Association football wingers
Lancashire cricketers
North v South cricketers
L. G. Robinson's XI cricketers
Lord Londesborough's XI cricketers
FA Cup Final players